Kongu Engineering College is an autonomous engineering college located at Perundurai, Erode district in the state of Tamil Nadu in India. It is affiliated to Anna University and accredited 'A++' Grade by National Assessment and Accreditation Council.

Courses
There are 14 courses offered in B.E./B.Tech.  
 B.E. Civil Engineering
 B.E. Mechanical Engineering
 B.E. Computer Science Engineering 
 B.E. Automobile Engineering
 B.E. Mechatronics Engineering
 B.E. Electronics and Communication Engineering
 B.E. Electrical and Electronics Engineering
 B.E. Electronics and Instrumentation Engineering
 B.Tech. Chemical Engineering
 B.Tech. Information Technology
 B.Tech. Food Technology
 B.E. Computer Science & Design
 B.Tech. Artificial Intelligence and Machine Learning
 B.Tech. Artificial Intelligence and Data Science

In the Applied Science category, there are three undergraduate and three postgraduate degrees offered.

There Applied Science Courses are:
 B.Sc. Software Engineering
 B.Sc. Information Technology
 B.Sc. Computer Technology
 M.Sc. Software Systems
 Master of Computer Application
 Master Of Business Administration

Co-curricular and extracurricular activities are run through associations, clubs, societies and students' chapters of professional bodies. They are managed by representatives of students and are monitored by the faculty.

Campus

Library
The college library was established in 1984 and its equipped with RFID facility.

Placement
no placement

.

Accommodation
The college has an on-campus guest house, alumni guest house, seven boys' hostels and three girls' hostel.

Awards
In 2003 the Technology Business Incubator at Kongu Engineering College won the National Award for Technology Business Incubators, an award given by the Department of Science and Technology's National Science & Technology Entrepreneurship Development Board.

Rankings

Kongu Engineering College was ranked 164 among engineering colleges by the National Institutional Ranking Framework (NIRF) in 2021.

References

External links
 
 Indian Government's education guide 

Engineering colleges in Tamil Nadu
Universities and colleges in Erode district
Educational institutions established in 1984